Frederick Illingworth (24 September 1844 – 8 September 1908), Australian politician, was a Member of Parliament in two Australian states, and a government minister in Western Australia. As a financier of land speculation in Victoria in the 1880s, he was heavily involved in the Victorian land boom.

Early life
Frederick Illingworth was born in Little Horton now part of Bradford, West Yorkshire on 24 September 1844. The son of a woolcomber, he emigrated to Victoria, Australia with his family at the age of four. As a young man he worked as an ironmonger at Brighton, Melbourne, and he later acquired pastoral land at Yalook.  On 5 September 1867 he married Elizabeth Tarry, with whom he had one son and one daughter. In the late 1870s he partnered with J. R. Hoskins to form an estate agent firm, but the business failed. In 1883 he returned to ironmongery, establishing an electroplating business in Melbourne.

Victorian land boom

In 1888, Illingworth founded and became the major share holder in the Centennial Land Bank. This was a land bank formed to finance speculation on real estate during the Victorian land boom, an economic bubble that had begun in the early 1880s.  The boom peaked around 1888, then crashed. Nearly every land company went into liquidation, and Illingworth was left with large debts. Despite having been elected to the Victorian Legislative Council for Northern Province in July 1889, Illingworth fled to Western Australia in 1890, and the following year his seat was declared vacant for non-attendance.

Further reading

In Western Australia
In Western Australia Illingworth established himself as a land and estate agent, and invested in a number of mines in the Murchison district. On 5 July 1894 he was elected to the Western Australian Legislative Assembly in the seat of Nannine. He held the seat until its abolition at the election of May 1897, when he instead won the seat of Central Murchison.  This in turn was abolished at the election of 24 April 1901, so Illingworth contested and won the seat of Cue. Defeated for Cue by Edward Heitmann in the election of 27 June 1904, he successfully contested the seat of West Perth on 27 October 1905, holding it until his resignation on 13 August 1907.

Illingworth initially sat in parliament in opposition to John Forrest's government. From August 1900 until May 1901 he was Leader of the Opposition, and was accordingly called upon to form a government when Forrest's successor George Throssell resigned as premier in May 1901.  He was unable to do so, however, because George Leake refused to serve under him, and the other oppositionists would not serve without Leake.  Eventually, an agreement was reached whereby Leake became Premier and Illingworth became Colonial Treasurer and Colonial Secretary. he held these portfolios throughout the term of the First Leake Ministry, and was reappointed to the positions in the Second Leake Ministry.  Following Leake's death in June 1902, Illingworth was not included in the ministry of Leake's successor Walter James. He was Chairman of Committees from 3 December 1903 to 27 June 1904, and again from 30 November 1905 until his resignation.

Illingworth had married Jane McGregor at Adelaide, South Australia on 18 November 1896.  They had no children. Illingworth's creditors released him from his financial obligations in 1903, and the Government of Western Australia then granted him £1000 as compensation for the financial proceedings taken against him in Victoria. After his resignation from the Legislative Assembly in August 1907, he returned to Victoria, and died at Brighton, Victoria on 8 September 1908, and was buried in Melbourne Cemetery.

See also
Illingworth v Houldsworth
Alfred Illingworth

References

1844 births
1908 deaths
Leaders of the Opposition in Western Australia
Chairmen of Committees of the Western Australian Legislative Assembly
Members of the Western Australian Legislative Assembly
People from Little Horton
Members of the Victorian Legislative Council
Treasurers of Western Australia
Burials in Victoria (Australia)
19th-century Australian politicians